The John Carner Jr. House is a historic house located at 1310 Best Road in East Greenbush, Rensselaer County, New York.

Description and history 
The house was built in about 1800 and is a two-story, five-bay wide, two-bay deep, heavy timber-framed dwelling designed in the Federal style. It is sheathed in clapboards and is topped by a medium pitched gable roof. It has a two-story rear kitchen wing, believed to be an earlier structure incorporated into the newly built house. It was last modified in the 1930s. Also on the property is a contributing three-bay English barn, two smaller barns, a potting shed, a corn crib, and a well house.

It was listed on the National Register of Historic Places on January 16, 2004.

References

Houses on the National Register of Historic Places in New York (state)
Federal architecture in New York (state)
Houses completed in 1800
Houses in Rensselaer County, New York
National Register of Historic Places in Rensselaer County, New York